The Estes Kefauver Federal Building & Courthouse Annex is a Federal office building and a courthouse of the United States District Court for the Middle District of Tennessee built in Nashville, Tennessee in 1952.  The nine-story annex to the building was completed in 1974.

Named after U.S. Senator Estes Kefauver, the building was designed by the Nashville firm of Marr & Holman in the Modern Style, and construction began in 1948.

Once construction of the nearby Fred D. Thompson U.S. Courthouse and Federal Building is completed in 2021, the Courts and other Federal Offices will be moved to the newer building.  The General Services Administration plans to maintain the building and house other federal agencies currently located throughout Nashville.

See also
 List of United States federal courthouses in Tennessee

References

Attribution

External links
 Estes Kefauver Federal Building and United States Courthouse at the GSA website

Courthouses in Tennessee
Federal courthouses in the United States
Government buildings completed in 1952
Buildings and structures in Nashville, Tennessee
Government buildings in Tennessee